Leandro Cesar de Sousa (born 6 July 1979) is a Brazilian football player.

Club statistics

References

External links

1979 births
Living people
Brazilian footballers
Brazilian expatriate footballers
Expatriate footballers in Japan
J2 League players
Santa Cruz Futebol Clube players
Ventforet Kofu players
Araguaína Futebol e Regatas players
Association football midfielders